Se-yeon is a Korean unisex given name.

People with this name include:
Choi Se-yeon (born 1977), stage name Choi Kang-hee, South Korean actress
Jin Se-yeon (born 1994),  South Korean actress
Kim Se-yeon (born 1999), better known as Geguri, South Korean video game player

Fictional characters with this name include:
Kang Se-yeon, in 2006 South Korean television series Lovers
Oh Se-yeon, in 2018 South Korean television series Rich Man
Go Se-yeon, in 2019 South Korean television series Abyss
Jung Se-yeon, in 2020 South Korean television series True Beauty

See also
List of Korean given names

Korean unisex given names